Frank Bois (or Boise) (September 13, 1841 – January 25, 1920) was a Canadian sailor who fought in the American Civil War. He received the U.S. military's highest decoration, the Medal of Honor, for his actions during the Siege of Vicksburg on May 27, 1863, while serving as Quartermaster aboard the USS Cincinnati.

Bois initially joined the 10th Massachusetts Infantry from Northampton, Massachusetts, in June 1861. He was transferred to the US Navy in September 1862, and discharged a year later.

Bois died on January 25, 1920, and is buried in Seattle, Washington.

Medal of Honor citation

See also

 List of American Civil War Medal of Honor recipients: A–F

References

1841 births
1920 deaths
American Civil War recipients of the Medal of Honor
Anglophone Quebec people
Pre-Confederation Canadian emigrants to the United States
Canadian sailors
People from Quebec City
Union Navy sailors
United States Navy Medal of Honor recipients
People from Orting, Washington